

Events

Pre-1600
338 BC – A Macedonian army led by Philip II defeated the combined forces of Athens and Thebes in the Battle of Chaeronea, securing Macedonian hegemony in Greece and the Aegean.
216 BC – The Carthaginian army led by Hannibal defeats a numerically superior Roman army at the Battle of Cannae.
49 BC – Caesar, who marched to Spain earlier in the year leaving Marcus Antonius in charge of Italy, defeats Pompey's general Afranius and Petreius in Ilerda (Lerida) north of the Ebro river.
 461 – Majorian is arrested near Tortona (northern Italy) and deposed by the Suebian general Ricimer as puppet emperor.
 932 – After a two-year siege, the city of Toledo, in Spain, surrenders to the forces of the Caliph of Córdoba Abd al-Rahman III, assuming an important victory in his campaign to subjugate the Central March.
1274 – Edward I of England returns from the Ninth Crusade and is crowned King seventeen days later.
1343 – After the execution of her husband, Jeanne de Clisson sells her estates and raises a force of men with which to attack French shipping and ports.
1377 – Russian troops are defeated by forces of the Blue Horde Khan Arapsha in the Battle on Pyana River.
1415 – Thomas Grey is executed for participating in the Southampton Plot.

1601–1900
1610 – During Henry Hudson's search for the Northwest Passage, he sails into what is now known as Hudson Bay.
1776 – The signing of the United States Declaration of Independence took place.
1790 – The first United States Census is conducted.
1798 – French Revolutionary Wars: The Battle of the Nile concludes in a British victory.
1830 – Charles X of France abdicates the throne in favor of his grandson Henri.
1858 – The Government of India Act 1858 replaces Company rule in India with that of the British Raj.
1869 – Japan's Edo society class system is abolished as part of the Meiji Restoration reforms.
1870 – Tower Subway, the world's first underground tube railway, opens in London, England, United Kingdom.
1873 – The Clay Street Hill Railroad begins operating the first cable car in San Francisco's famous cable car system.
1897 – Anglo-Afghan War: The Siege of Malakand ends when a relief column is able to reach the British garrison in the Malakand states.

1901–present
1903 – The Ilinden–Preobrazhenie Uprising against the Ottoman Empire begins.
1914 – The German occupation of Luxembourg during World War I begins.
1916 – World War I: Austrian sabotage causes the sinking of the Italian battleship Leonardo da Vinci in Taranto.
1918 – The first general strike in Canadian history takes place in Vancouver.
1922 – A typhoon hits Shantou, Republic of China, killing more than 50,000 people.
1923 – Vice President Calvin Coolidge becomes U.S. President upon the death of President Warren G. Harding.
1932 – The positron (antiparticle of the electron) is discovered by Carl D. Anderson.
1934 – Reichskanzler Adolf Hitler becomes Führer of Germany following the death of President Paul von Hindenburg.
1937 – The Marihuana Tax Act of 1937 is passed in America, the effect of which is to render marijuana and all its by-products illegal.
1939 – Albert Einstein and Leo Szilard write a letter to Franklin D. Roosevelt, urging him to begin the Manhattan Project to develop a nuclear weapon.
1943 – The Holocaust: Jewish prisoners stage a revolt at Treblinka, one of the deadliest of Nazi death camps where approximately 900,000 persons were murdered in less than 18 months.
  1943   – World War II: The Motor Torpedo Boat PT-109 is rammed by the Japanese destroyer Amagiri and sinks. Lt. John F. Kennedy, future U.S. president, saves all but two of his crew.
1944 – ASNOM: Birth of the Socialist Republic of Macedonia, celebrated as Day of the Republic in North Macedonia.
  1944   – World War II: The largest trade convoy of the world wars arrives safely in the Western Approaches.
1945 – World War II: End of the Potsdam Conference.
1947 – A British South American Airways Avro Lancastrian airliner crashes into a mountain during a flight from Buenos Aires, Argentina to Santiago, Chile. The wreckage would not be found until 1998.
1968 – An earthquake hits Casiguran, Aurora, Philippines killing more than 270 people and wounding 261.
1973 – A flash fire kills 51 people at the Summerland amusement centre at Douglas, Isle of Man.
1980 – A bomb explodes at the railway station in Bologna, Italy, killing 85 people and wounding more than 200.
1982 – The Helsinki Metro, the first rapid transit system of Finland, is opened to the general public.
1985 – Delta Air Lines Flight 191, a Lockheed L-1011 TriStar, crashes at Dallas/Fort Worth International Airport killing 137.
1989 – Pakistan is re-admitted to the Commonwealth of Nations after having restored democracy for the first time since 1972.
  1989   – A massacre is carried out by an Indian Peace Keeping Force in Sri Lanka killing 64 ethnic Tamil civilians.
1990 – Iraq invades Kuwait, eventually leading to the Gulf War.
1999 – The Gaisal train disaster claims 285 lives in Assam, India.
2005 – Air France Flight 358 lands at Toronto Pearson International Airport and runs off the runway, causing the plane to burst into flames leaving 12 injuries and no fatalities.
2014 – At least 146 people were killed and more than 114 injured in a factory explosion in Kunshan, Jiangsu, China.

Births

Pre-1600
1260 – Kyawswa of Pagan, last ruler of the Pagan Kingdom (d. 1299)
1455 – John Cicero, Elector of Brandenburg (d. 1499)
1533 – Theodor Zwinger, Swiss physician and scholar (d. 1588)
1549 – Mikołaj Krzysztof "the Orphan" Radziwiłł, Polish nobleman (d. 1616)

1601–1900
1612 – Saskia van Uylenburgh, Dutch model and wife of Rembrandt van Rijn (d. 1642)
1627 – Samuel Dirksz van Hoogstraten, Dutch painter (d. 1678)
1630 – Estephan El Douaihy, Maronite patriarch (d. 1704)
1646 – Jean-Baptiste du Casse, French admiral and buccaneer (d. 1715)
1672 – Johann Jakob Scheuchzer, Swiss paleontologist and scholar (d. 1733)
1674 – Philippe II, Duke of Orléans (d. 1723)
1696 – Mahmud I, Ottoman sultan (d. 1754)
1702 – Dietrich of Anhalt-Dessau (d. 1769)
1703 – Lorenzo Ricci, Italian religious leader, 18th Superior General of the Society of Jesus (d. 1775)
1740 – Jean Baptiste Camille Canclaux, French general (d. 1817)
1754 – Pierre Charles L'Enfant, French-American architect and engineer, designed Washington, D.C. (d. 1825)
1788 – Leopold Gmelin, German chemist and academic (d. 1853)
1815 – Adolf Friedrich von Schack, German poet and historian (d. 1894)
1820 – John Tyndall, Irish-English physicist and mountaineer (d. 1893)
1828 – Manuel Pavía y Rodríguez de Alburquerque, Spanish general (d. 1895)
1834 – Frédéric Auguste Bartholdi, French sculptor, designed the Statue of Liberty (d. 1904)
1835 – Elisha Gray, American businessman, co-founded Western Electric (d. 1901)
1861 – Prafulla Chandra Ray, Indian chemist and academic (d. 1944)
1865 – Irving Babbitt, American academic and critic (d. 1933)
  1865   – John Radecki, Australian stained glass artist (d. 1955)
1867 – Ernest Dowson, English poet, novelist, and short story writer (d. 1900)
1868 – Constantine I of Greece (d. 1923)
1870 – Marianne Weber, German sociologist and suffragist (d. 1954)
1871 – John French Sloan, American painter and illustrator (d. 1951)
1872 – George E. Stewart, Australian-American colonel, Medal of Honor recipient (d. 1946)
1876 – Pingali Venkayya, Indian geologist, designed the Flag of India (d. 1963)
1877 – Ravishankar Shukla, Indian lawyer and politician, 1st Chief Minister of Madhya Pradesh (d. 1956)
1878 – Aino Kallas, Finnish-Estonian author (d. 1956)
1880 – Arthur Dove, American painter and educator (d. 1946)
1882 – Red Ames, American baseball player and manager (d. 1936)
  1882   – Albert Bloch, American painter and academic (d. 1961)
1884 – Rómulo Gallegos, Venezuelan author and politician, 46th President of Venezuela (d. 1969)
1886 – John Alexander Douglas McCurdy, Canadian pilot and politician, 20th Lieutenant Governor of Nova Scotia (d. 1961)
1887 – Oskar Anderson, Bulgarian-German mathematician and statistician (d. 1960)
1889 – Margaret Lawrence, American stage actress (d. 1929)
1891 – Arthur Bliss, English composer and conductor (d. 1975)
  1891   – Viktor Zhirmunsky, Russian linguist and historian (d. 1971)
1892 – Jack L. Warner, Canadian-born American production manager and producer, co-founded Warner Bros. (d. 1978)
1894 – Bertha Lutz, Brazilian feminist and scientist (d.1976)
1895 – Matt Henderson, New Zealand cricketer (d. 1970)
1897 – Karl-Otto Koch, German SS officer (d. 1945)
  1897   – Max Weber, Swiss lawyer and politician (d. 1974)
1898 – Ernő Nagy, Hungarian fencer (d. 1977)
1899 – Charles Bennett, English director and screenwriter (d. 1995)
1900 – Holling C. Holling, American author and illustrator (d. 1973)
  1900   – Helen Morgan, American actress and singer (d. 1941)

1901–present
1902 – Pope Cyril VI of Alexandria (d. 1971)
  1902   – Mina Rees, American mathematician (d.1997)
1905 – Karl Amadeus Hartmann, German composer (d. 1963)
  1905   – Myrna Loy, American actress (d. 1993)
  1905   – Ruth Nelson, American actress (d. 1992)
1907 – Mary Hamman, American journalist and author (d. 1984)
1910 – Roger MacDougall, Scottish director, playwright, and screenwriter (d. 1993)
1911 – Ann Dvorak, American actress (d. 1979)
1912 – Palle Huld, Danish actor (d. 2010)
  1912   – Håkon Stenstadvold, Norwegian painter, illustrator, and critic (d. 1977)
  1912   – Vladimir Žerjavić, Croatian economist and author (d. 2001)
1913 – Xavier Thaninayagam, Sri Lankan scholar and academic (d. 1980)
1914 – Félix Leclerc, Canadian singer-songwriter, actor, and poet (d. 1988)
  1914   – Big Walter Price, American singer-songwriter and pianist (d. 2012)
  1914   – Beatrice Straight, American actress (d. 2001)
1915 – Gary Merrill, American actor (d. 1990)
1916 – Alfonso A. Ossorio, Filipino-American painter and sculptor (d. 1990)
1917 – Wah Chang, Chinese-American artist and designer (d. 2003)
1919 – Nehemiah Persoff, Israeli-American actor (d. 2022)
1920 – Louis Pauwels, French journalist and author (d. 1997)
  1920   – Augustus Rowe, Canadian physician and politician (d. 2013)
1921 – Alan Whicker, Egyptian-English journalist (d. 2013)
1922 – Betsy Bloomingdale, American philanthropist and socialite (d. 2016)
  1922   – Geoffrey Dutton, Australian historian and author (d. 1998)
1923 – Shimon Peres, Polish-Israeli lawyer and politician, 9th President of Israel (d. 2016)
  1923   – Ike Williams, American boxer (d. 1994)
1924 – James Baldwin, American novelist, poet, and critic (d. 1987)
  1924   – Joe Harnell, American pianist and composer (d. 2005)
  1924   – Carroll O'Connor, American actor, director, producer, and screenwriter (d. 2001)
1925 – K. Arulanandan, Ceylon-American engineer and academic (d. 2004)
  1925   – John Dexter, English director and producer (d. 1990)
  1925   – John McCormack, Canadian ice hockey player (d. 2017)
  1925   – Jorge Rafael Videla, Argentinian general and politician, 43rd President of Argentina (d. 2013)
1927 – Peter Swinnerton-Dyer, English mathematician and academic (d. 2018)
1928 – Malcolm Hilton, English cricketer (d. 1990)
1929 – Roy Crimmins, English trombonist and composer (d. 2014)
  1929   – John Gale, English director and producer
  1929   – Vidya Charan Shukla, Indian politician, Indian Minister of External Affairs (d. 2013)
  1929   – David Waddington, Baron Waddington, English lawyer and politician, Governor of Bermuda (d. 2017)
1930 – Vali Myers, Australian painter and dancer (d. 2003)
1931 – Pierre DuMaine, American bishop and academic (d. 2019)
  1931   – Eddie Fuller, South African cricketer (d. 2008)
  1931   – Karl Miller, English journalist and critic (d. 2014)
  1931   – Viliam Schrojf, Czech footballer (d. 2007)
1932 – Lamar Hunt, American businessman, co-founded the American Football League and World Championship Tennis (d. 2006)
  1932   – Peter O'Toole, British-Irish actor and producer (d. 2013)
1933 – Ioannis Varvitsiotis, Greek politician, Greek Minister of Defence
1934 – Valery Bykovsky, Russian general and cosmonaut (d. 2019)
1935 – Hank Cochran, American singer-songwriter and guitarist (d. 2010)
1936 – Anthony Payne, English composer and author (d. 2021)
1937 – Ron Brierley, New Zealand businessman
  1937   – Billy Cannon, American football player and dentist (d. 2018)
  1937   – María Duval, Mexican actress and singer
  1937   – Garth Hudson, Canadian keyboard player, songwriter, and producer
1938 – Dave Balon, Canadian ice hockey player and coach (d. 2007)
  1938   – Pierre de Bané, Israeli-Canadian lawyer and politician (d. 2019)
  1938   – Terry Peck, Falkland Islander soldier (d. 2006)
1939 – Benjamin Barber, American theorist, author, and academic (d. 2017)
  1939   – Wes Craven, American director, producer, and screenwriter (d. 2015)
  1939   – John W. Snow, American businessman and politician, 73rd United States Secretary of the Treasury
1940 – Angel Lagdameo, Filipino archbishop (d. 2022)
  1940   – Beko Ransome-Kuti, Nigerian physician and activist (d. 2006)
  1940   – Will Tura, Belgian singer-songwriter and guitarist
1941 – Doris Coley, American singer (d. 2000)
  1941   – Jules A. Hoffmann, Luxembourgian-French biologist and academic, Nobel Prize laureate
  1941   – François Weyergans, Belgian director and screenwriter (d. 2022)
1942 – Isabel Allende, Chilean-American novelist, essayist, essayist
  1942   – Leo Beenhakker, Dutch football manager
  1942   – Juan Formell, Cuban singer-songwriter and bass player (d. 2014)
  1942   – Nell Irvin Painter, American author and historian
1943 – Herbert M. Allison, American lieutenant and businessman (d. 2013)
  1943   – Tom Burgmeier, American baseball player and coach
  1943   – Jon R. Cavaiani, English-American sergeant, Medal of Honor recipient (d. 2014)
  1943   – Rose Tremain, English novelist and short story writer
1944 – Jim Capaldi, English drummer and singer-songwriter (d. 2005)
  1944   – Naná Vasconcelos, Brazilian singer and berimbau player (d. 2016)
1945 – Joanna Cassidy, American actress
  1945   – Alex Jesaulenko, Austrian-Australian footballer and coach
  1945   – Bunker Roy, Indian educator and activist
  1945   – Eric Simms, Australian rugby league player and coach
1946 – James Howe, American journalist and author
1947 – Ruth Bakke, Norwegian organist and composer
  1947   – Lawrence Wright, American journalist, author, and screenwriter
1948 – Andy Fairweather Low, Welsh singer-songwriter, guitarist, and producer
  1948   – Dennis Prager, American radio host and author
  1948   – Tapan Kumar Sarkar, Indian-American electrical engineer and academic (d. 2021)
  1948   – James Street, American football and baseball player (d. 2013)
  1948   – Snoo Wilson, English playwright and screenwriter (d. 2013)
1949 – James Fallows, American journalist and author
  1949   – Bertalan Farkas, Hungarian general and cosmonaut
1950 – Jussi Adler-Olsen, Danish author and publisher
  1950   – Ted Turner, British guitarist
1951 – Andrew Gold, American singer-songwriter and producer (d. 2011)
  1951   – Steve Hillage, English singer-songwriter and guitarist
  1951   – Joe Lynn Turner, American singer-songwriter and guitarist
  1951   – Per Westerberg, Swedish businessman and politician, Speaker of the Parliament of Sweden
1952 – Alain Giresse, French footballer and manager
1953 – Donnie Munro, Scottish singer and guitarist
  1953   – Butch Patrick, American actor
  1953   – Anthony Seldon, English historian and author
1954 – Sammy McIlroy, Northern Irish footballer and manager
1955 – Caleb Carr, American historian and author
  1955   – Tony Godden, English footballer and manager
  1955   – Butch Vig, American drummer, songwriter, and record producer
1956 – Fulvio Melia, Italian-American physicist, astrophysicist, and author
1957 – Jacky Rosen, United States senator 
1959 – Victoria Jackson, American actress and singer
  1959   – Johnny Kemp, Bahamian singer-songwriter and producer (d. 2015)
  1959   – Apollonia Kotero, American singer and actress
1960 – Linda Fratianne, American figure skater
  1960   – Neal Morse, American singer and keyboard player
  1960   – David Yow, American singer-songwriter
1961 – Pete de Freitas, Trinidadian-British drummer and producer  (d. 1989)
1962 – Lee Mavers, English singer, songwriter and guitarist
  1962   – Cynthia Stevenson, American actress
1963 – Laura Bennett, American architect and fashion designer
  1963   – Uğur Tütüneker, Turkish footballer and manager
1964 – Frank Biela, German race car driver
  1964   – Mary-Louise Parker, American actress
1965 – Joe Hockey, Australian lawyer and politician, 38th Treasurer of Australia
  1965   – Hisanobu Watanabe, Japanese baseball player and coach
1966 – Takashi Iizuka, Japanese wrestler
  1966   – Grainne Leahy, Irish cricketer
  1966   – Tim Wakefield, American baseball player and sportscaster
1967 – Aaron Krickstein, American tennis player
  1967   – Aline Brosh McKenna, American screenwriter and producer
1968 – Stefan Effenberg, German footballer and sportscaster
1969 – Cedric Ceballos, American basketball player
  1969   – Fernando Couto, Portuguese footballer and manager
1970 – Tony Amonte, American ice hockey player and coach
  1970   – Kevin Smith, American actor, director, producer, and screenwriter
  1970   – Philo Wallace, Barbadian cricketer
1971 – Jason Bell, Australian rugby league player
  1971   – Michael Hughes, Irish footballer and manager
1972 – Mohamed Al-Deayea, Saudi Arabian footballer
  1972   – Muriel Bowser, American politician, Mayor of Washington, D.C.
1973 – Danie Keulder, Namibian cricketer
  1973   – Miguel Mendonca, Zimbabwean journalist and author
  1973   – Susie O'Neill, Australian swimmer
1974 – Phil Williams, English journalist and radio host
1975 – Mineiro, Brazilian footballer
  1975   – Xu Huaiwen, Chinese-German badminton player and coach
  1975   – Tamás Molnár, Hungarian water polo player
1976 – Reyes Estévez, Spanish runner
  1976   – Jay Heaps, American soccer player and coach
  1976   – Michael Weiss, American figure skater
  1976   – Sam Worthington, English-Australian actor and producer
  1976   – Mohammad Zahid, Pakistani cricketer
1977 – Edward Furlong, American actor
1978 – Goran Gavrančić, Serbian footballer
  1978   – Matt Guerrier, American baseball player
  1978   – Deividas Šemberas, Lithuanian footballer
  1978   – Dragan Vukmir, Serbian footballer
1979 – Marco Bonura, Italian footballer
  1979   – Reuben Kosgei, Kenyan runner
1980 – Ivica Banović, Croatian footballer
1981 – Alexander Emelianenko, Russian mixed martial artist and boxer
  1981   – Tim Murtagh, Irish-English cricketer
1982 – Hélder Postiga, Portuguese footballer
  1982   – Kerry Rhodes, American football player
  1982   – Grady Sizemore, American baseball player
1983 – Michel Bastos, Brazilian footballer
1984 – Giampaolo Pazzini, Italian footballer
1985 – Stephen Ferris, Irish rugby player
  1985   – David Hart Smith, Canadian wrestler
  1985   – Britt Nicole, American Christian pop artist
1986 – Mathieu Razanakolona, Canadian skier
1988 – Rob Kwiet, Canadian ice hockey player
1989 – Nacer Chadli, Belgian footballer
1990 – Ima Bohush, Belarusian tennis player
  1990   – Vitalia Diatchenko, Russian tennis player
  1990   – Skylar Diggins-Smith, American basketball player
1992 – Charli XCX, English singer-songwriter
1993 – Gael Bussa, Congolese politician
1994 – Laura Pigossi, Brazilian tennis player
  1994   – Laremy Tunsil, American football player
1995 – Kristaps Porziņģis, Latvian basketball player
1996 – Keston Hiura, American baseball player
  1996   – Simone Manuel, American swimmer
1999 – Mark Lee, Korean-Canadian singer
2000 – Varvara Gracheva, Russian tennis player

Deaths

Pre-1600
216 BC – Gnaeus Servilius Geminus, Roman consul
  216 BC – Lucius Aemilius Paullus, Roman consul and general
  216 BC – Marcus Minucius Rufus, Roman consul
 257 – Pope Stephen I
 575 – Ahudemmeh, Syriac Orthodox Grand Metropolitan of the East.
 640 – Pope Severinus
 686 – Pope John V
 855 – Ahmad ibn Hanbal, Arab theologian and jurist (b. 780)
 924 – Ælfweard of Wessex (b. 904)
1075 – Patriarch John VIII of Constantinople
1100 – William II of England (b. 1056)
1222 – Raymond VI, Count of Toulouse (b. 1156)
1277 – Mu'in al-Din Sulaiman Pervane, Chancellor and Regent of the Sultanate of Rum
1316 – Louis of Burgundy (b. 1297)
1330 – Yolande of Dreux, Queen consort of Scotland and Duchess consort of Brittany (b. 1263)
1332 – King Christopher II of Denmark (b. 1276)
1415 – Thomas Grey, English conspirator (b. 1384)
1445 – Oswald von Wolkenstein, Austrian poet and composer (b. 1376)
1451 – Elizabeth of Görlitz (b. 1390)
1511 – Andrew Barton, Scottish admiral (b. 1466)
1512 – Alessandro Achillini, Italian physician and philosopher (b. 1463)
1589 – Henry III of France (b. 1551)

1601–1900
1605 – Richard Leveson, English admiral (b. c. 1570)
1611 – Katō Kiyomasa, Japanese daimyō (b. 1562)
1667 – Francesco Borromini, Swiss architect, designed San Carlo alle Quattro Fontane and Sant'Agnese in Agone (b. 1599)
1696 – Robert Campbell of Glenlyon (b. 1630)
1769 – Daniel Finch, 8th Earl of Winchilsea, English politician, Lord President of the Council (b. 1689)
1788 – Thomas Gainsborough, English painter (b. 1727)
1799 – Jacques-Étienne Montgolfier, French inventor, co-invented the hot air balloon (b. 1745)
1815 – Guillaume Brune, French general and politician (b. 1763)
1823 – Lazare Carnot, French mathematician, general, and politician, president of the National Convention (b. 1753)
1834 – Harriet Arbuthnot, English diarist (b. 1793)
1849 – Muhammad Ali of Egypt, Ottoman Albanian commander (b. 1769)
1854 – Heinrich Clauren, German author (b. 1771)
1859 – Horace Mann, American educator and politician (b. 1796)
1876 – "Wild Bill" Hickok, American sheriff (b. 1837)
1889 – Eduardo Gutiérrez, Argentinian author (b. 1851)
1890 – Louise-Victorine Ackermann, French poet and author (b. 1813)

1901–present
1903 – Eduard Magnus Jakobson, Estonian missionary and engraver (b. 1847)
  1903   – Edmond Nocard, French veterinarian and microbiologist (b. 1850)
1913 – Ferenc Pfaff, Hungarian architect and academic, designed Zagreb Central Station (b. 1851)
1915 – John Downer, Australian politician, 16th premier of South Australia (b. 1843)
1917 – Jaan Mahlapuu, Estonian military pilot (b. 1894)
1921 – Enrico Caruso, Italian tenor and actor (b. 1873)
1922 – Alexander Graham Bell, Scottish-Canadian engineer, invented the telephone (b. 1847)
1923 – Warren G. Harding, American journalist and politician, 29th president of the United States (b. 1865)
1923 – Joseph Whitty, Irish Hunger Striker (b. 1904)
1934 – Paul von Hindenburg, German field marshal and politician, 2nd president of Germany (b. 1847)
1937 – Artur Sirk, Estonian soldier, lawyer, and politician (b. 1900)
1939 – Harvey Spencer Lewis, American mystic and author (b. 1883)
1945 – Pietro Mascagni, Italian composer and educator (b. 1863)
1955 – Alfred Lépine, Canadian ice hockey player and coach (b. 1901)
  1955   – Wallace Stevens, American poet and educator (b. 1879)
1963 – Oliver La Farge, American anthropologist and author (b. 1901)
1967 – Walter Terence Stace, English-American epistemologist, philosopher, and academic (b. 1886)
1970 – Angus MacFarlane-Grieve, English academic, mathematician, rower, and soldier (b. 1891)
1972 – Brian Cole, American bass player (b. 1942)
  1972   – Paul Goodman, American psychotherapist and author (b. 1911)
  1972   – Helen Hoyt, American poet and author (b. 1887)
1973 – Ismail Abdul Rahman, Former Deputy Prime Minister of Malaysia (b.1915)
1973 – Jean-Pierre Melville, French actor, director, producer, and screenwriter (b. 1917)
1974 – Douglas Hawkes, English race car driver and businessman (b. 1893)
1976 – László Kalmár, Hungarian mathematician and academic (b. 1905)
  1976   – Fritz Lang, Austrian-American director, producer, and screenwriter (b. 1890)
1978 – Carlos Chávez, Mexican composer and conductor (b. 1899)
  1978   – Antony Noghès, French businessman, founded the Monaco Grand Prix (b. 1890)
1979 – Thurman Munson, American baseball player (b. 1947)
1981 – Kieran Doherty, Irish hunger striker and politician (b. 1955)
1981 – Stefanie Clausen, Danish diver (b. 1900)
1983 – James Jamerson, American bass player (b. 1936)
1986 – Roy Cohn, American lawyer and politician (b. 1927)
1988 – Joe Carcione, American activist and author (b. 1914)
  1988   – Raymond Carver, American short story writer and poet (b. 1938)
1990 – Norman Maclean, American short story writer and essayist (b. 1902)
  1990   – Edwin Richfield, English actor and screenwriter (b. 1921)
1992 – Michel Berger, French singer-songwriter and producer (b. 1947)
1996 – Michel Debré, French lawyer and politician, 150th prime minister of France (b. 1912)
  1996   – Obdulio Varela, Uruguayan footballer and manager (b. 1917)
  1996   – Mohamed Farrah Aidid, Somalian general and politician, 5th president of Somalia (b. 1934)
1997 – William S. Burroughs, American novelist, short story writer, and essayist (b. 1914)
  1997   – Fela Kuti, Nigerian singer-songwriter and activist (b. 1938)
1998 – Shari Lewis, American television host and puppeteer (b. 1933)
1999 – Willie Morris, American writer (b. 1934)
2003 – Peter Safar, Austrian-American physician and academic (b. 1924)
2004 – Ferenc Berényi, Hungarian painter and academic (b. 1929)
  2004   – François Craenhals, Belgian illustrator (b. 1926)
  2004   – Heinrich Mark, Estonian lawyer and politician, 5th prime minister of Estonia in exile (b. 1911)
2005 – Steven Vincent, American journalist and author (b. 1955)
2007 – Chauncey Bailey, American journalist (b. 1950)
2008 – Fujio Akatsuka, Japanese illustrator (b. 1935)
2011 – José Sanchis Grau, Spanish author and illustrator (b. 1932)
2012 – Gabriel Horn, English biologist and academic (b. 1927)
  2012   – Magnus Isacsson, Canadian director and producer (b. 1948)
  2012   – Jimmy Jones, American singer-songwriter (b. 1930)
  2012   – John Keegan, English historian and journalist (b. 1934)
  2012   – Bernd Meier, German footballer (b. 1972)
  2012   – Marguerite Piazza, American soprano (b. 1920)
2013 – Julius L. Chambers, American lawyer and activist (b. 1936)
  2013   – Richard E. Dauch, American businessman, co-founded American Axle (b. 1942)
  2013   – Alla Kushnir, Russian–Israeli chess player (b. 1941)
2014 – Ed Joyce, American journalist (b. 1932)
  2014   – Billie Letts, American author and educator (b. 1938)
  2014   – Barbara Prammer, Austrian social worker and politician (b. 1954)
  2014   – James Thompson, American-Finnish author (b. 1964)
2015 – Forrest Bird, American pilot and engineer (b. 1921)
  2015   – Giovanni Conso, Italian jurist and politician, Italian Minister of Justice (b. 1922)
  2015   – Piet Fransen, Dutch footballer (b. 1936)
  2015   – Jack Spring, American baseball player (b. 1933)
2016 – Terence Bayler, New Zealand actor (b. 1930)
  2016   – David Huddleston, American actor (b. 1930)
  2016   – Franciszek Macharski, Polish cardinal (b. 1927)
  2016   – Ahmed Zewail, Egyptian-American chemist and academic, Nobel Prize laureate (b. 1946)
2017 – Judith Jones, American literary and cookbook editor (b. 1924)
2020 – Suzanne Perlman, Hungarian-Dutch visual artist (b. 1922)
2022 – Vin Scully, American sportscaster and game show host (b. 1927)

Holidays and observances
Christian feast day:
Ahudemmeh (Syriac Orthodox Church).
Basil Fool for Christ (Russian Orthodox Church)
Blessed Justin Russolillo
Eusebius of Vercelli
Peter Faber
Peter Julian Eymard
Plegmund
Pope Stephen I
 Portiuncola Indulgence ("Pardon of Assisi"), the plenary indulgence related to St.Francis of Assisi (Catholic Church).
Samuel David Ferguson (Episcopal Church)
August 2 (Eastern Orthodox liturgics)
Day of Azerbaijani cinema (Azerbaijan)
Our Lady of the Angels Day (Costa Rica)
Paratroopers Day (Russia)
Republic Day (North Macedonia)
Romani genocide-related observances, including:
Roma Holocaust Memorial Day (Council of Europe, European Parliament)

References

External links

Days of the year
August